Mee Sreyobhilashi is a 2007 Indian Telugu-language philosophical film, produced by Dr. Y. Sonia Reddy on VISU Films Pvt Ltd banner and directed by V. Eshwar Reddy. Dailouges by Ramesh cheppala Starring Rajendra Prasad, Naresh  and music composed by Koti. Upon release, the film received highly positive reviews and remained a box office hit. The film won two Nandi Awards and was premiered in the Indian panorama section at the International Film Festival of India. The movie was remade in Kannada as Lift Kodla starring Jaggesh and Komal. The core plot of the movie was reportedly inspired from the 1998 Japanese film Ikinai.

Plot
Rajaji is a middle-aged man who does not have any dependents as both his wife and daughter die. His daughter takes her life because of the rejection from her boyfriend. Rajaji is so much depressed with the entire episode that he too wants to die. He gathers like-minded people with suicidal tendencies. He arranges a bus trip to Srisailam where they want to jump the bus from the highest cliff. Meanwhile, this news is leaked to the cops. And the cops are in search of these people. Along the way, the passengers on the bus come to realize that their problems are very insignificant and that they were not worth taking their life. Rajaji reveals that was his plan all along, but on their way back the bus's brakes get stuck. Rajaji saves all the passengers, but he himself can not get out. However, the police arrive just in time to save him.

Cast

 Rajendra Prasad as Rajaji
 Naresh as Surya Prakash Reddy
 Nasser as ACP Sunil
 Brahmanandam as Swamiji
 Ali as Watchman Ali
 Tanikella Bharani as Hotel Owner
 Chalapathi Rao as Minister
 Krishna Bhagawan as Chitila Chinna Rao
 Raghu Babu as Mallesh
 Chinna as Rama Krishna
 Raavi Kondala Rao as Raghuram
 Ravi Varma as Vinod
 Jai Dhanush as Kiran
 Srinivas Reddy as Koyadora
 Ram Jagan as Constable
 Kadambari Kiran as Constable
 Chitram Seenu
 Gundu Hanumantha Rao as Watchman
 Garimalla Visweswara Rao as Beggar
 Radha Kumari as Lakshmi
 Meena as Amala
 Medha as Swapna
 Shilpa Chakravarthy as Anchor Sirisha
 Roopa Kaur as Sandhya
 Sruthi as Mallesh's wife
 Master Suraj as Chandu

Soundtrack

Music composed by Koti. Music released on MADHURA Audio Company.

Awards
Nandi Awards - 2007 
 Best Feature Film - Gold - V. Easwar Reddy
 Best Lyricist - Venegella Rambabu

Others
 VCDs and DVDs on - VOLGA Videos, Hyderabad

References

External links
 

2007 films
2000s Telugu-language films
Indian drama films
Films about suicide
Films scored by Koti
Telugu films remade in other languages
Indian road movies
Films set in Hyderabad, India
Films shot in Hyderabad, India